The following is a list of colleges and universities in the U.S. state of Louisiana.

Colleges, universities, and professional schools

Public colleges and universities

Louisiana State University System 
 Louisiana State University - Baton Rouge
 Louisiana State University at Eunice† - Eunice
 Louisiana State University of Alexandria - Alexandria
 Louisiana State University Shreveport - Shreveport
 LSU Health Sciences Center New Orleans - New Orleans
 LSU Health Sciences Center Shreveport - Shreveport
 Paul M. Hebert Law Center - Baton Rouge

Southern University System 
 Southern University - Baton Rouge
 Southern University at New Orleans - New Orleans
 Southern University at Shreveport† - Shreveport
 Southern University Law Center - Baton Rouge

University of Louisiana System 
 Grambling State University - Grambling
 Louisiana Tech University - Ruston
 McNeese State University - Lake Charles
 Nicholls State University - Thibodaux
 Northwestern State University - Natchitoches
 Southeastern Louisiana University - Hammond
 University of Louisiana at Lafayette - Lafayette
 University of Louisiana at Monroe - Monroe
 University of New Orleans - New Orleans

Louisiana Community and Technical College System 
 Baton Rouge Community College - Baton Rouge
 Bossier Parish Community College - Bossier City
 Central Louisiana Technical Community College - Alexandria
 Delgado Community College - New Orleans
 Fletcher Technical Community College - Schriever
 Louisiana Delta Community College - Monroe
 Northshore Technical Community College - Lacombe
 Northwest Louisiana Technical Community College - Minden
 Nunez Community College - Chalmette
 River Parishes Community College - Gonzales
 South Louisiana Community College - Lafayette
 SOWELA Technical Community College - Lake Charles

† two-year colleges, not named "community college"

Private research university (non-sectarian)
 Tulane University - New Orleans

Private colleges and universities
 Centenary College of Louisiana* - Shreveport
 Dillard University* - New Orleans
 Franciscan Missionaries of Our Lady University - Baton Rouge
 Louisiana Christian University* - Pineville
 Loyola University New Orleans - New Orleans
 University of Holy Cross * - New Orleans
 Xavier University of Louisiana - New Orleans

* liberal arts colleges

For-profit colleges
 American School of Business - Shreveport
 Blue Cliff College - various (7)
 Delta College of Arts & Technology - Baton Rouge
 ITI Technical College - Baton Rouge

Religious seminaries
 Louisiana Baptist University and Theological Seminary - Shreveport
 New Orleans Baptist Theological Seminary - New Orleans
 Notre Dame Seminary - New Orleans
 Saint Joseph Seminary College - Covington

Closed or relocated institutions

Former public technical colleges
 Louisiana Technical College, 42 statewide campuses, 1930–2012 — merged and are now aligned to other institutions within the Louisiana Community and Technical College System
 South Central Louisiana Technical College, 4 campuses — merged 2018 into South Louisiana, Fletcher, and River Parishes Community Colleges

Former private colleges and universities
 Dodd College, Shreveport, 1927–1942 — closed
 H. Sophie Newcomb Memorial College, New Orleans, 1886–2006 — merged within Tulane University
 Jefferson College, Convent, 1800s — closed. Campus currently a Jesuit retreat house.
Leland College, New Orleans, Baker, 1870–1960 — closed
 Mount Lebanon University, Mount Lebanon, 1860–1906 — closed, replaced by Louisiana Baptists with Louisiana College
St. Charles College, Grand Coteau, 1837–1922 — closed. Campus currently a Jesuit scholasticate, retreat center, and retirement home.
St. Mary's Dominican College, New Orleans, 1860–1984 — closed
Straight University, New Orleans, 1868–1934 — merged to form Dillard University

Former for-profit colleges
 Columbus University — relocated to Mississippi and possibly closed as a diploma mill
 ITT Technical Institute — closed September 2016
 Virginia College 1983-2018 — closed

See also

 List of college athletic programs in Louisiana
 University of Louisiana
 Southern Association of Colleges and Schools
 List of unaccredited institutions of higher education
 Louisiana Board of Regents
 Higher education in the United States
 Lists of American institutions of higher education
 List of recognized higher education accreditation organizations

Footnotes

External links
Department of Education listing of accredited institutions in Louisiana
Louisiana Association of Independent Colleges and Universities

Louisiana
Colleges